The Samsung SPH-i300 was an early Palm OS-based smartphone manufactured by Samsung.  It was released around 2001.
It was marketed in the United States for use on Sprint's mobile phone network.
It was the first "PDA phone" (as devices that combined phone and PDA functions were then called) in the US with a color screen.

The CDMA phone has a candybar-style design.
It operates like a standard color Palm OS device, but several hard (external) and software buttons launch the 'phone' application, which manages calls.

The phone shipped with a charging cradle with a DE-9 serial port, extra battery, and a case.

Applications
Installed applications included ones carried over from existing Palm handheld non-phone devices:
Graffiti, Memo Pad, Date Book, Scheduler, Calculator, To Do List, Alarm/Clock, Address Book, Expense Manager, and Palm Desktop Software. ZIO PalmGolf was another application.

In addition, applications to support voice and data communications were included: Blazer, Mail, Messages, Phone, Speed Dial, Voice Dial, and Voice Memo.

History and reception
The SPH-i300 was the first Palm-OS-based smartphone from Samsung, and cost $499. The phone was not compatible with Sprint's 3G network and its maximum connection speed of 14.4kbit/s made browsing slow, but browsing "the real web" in 2001 was an advance on the WAP browsers on other mobile phones. It competed with another Palm OS phone, the Kyocera QCP-6035.

Follow-up SPH-i330 model 
Samsung followed up the SPH-i300 with the SPH-i330 in 2003, also on Sprint. The SPH-i330 has a more rounded body and PC connectivity over USB rather than a serial port, but has the same screen, Palm OS version, and general feature set as the SPH-i300.

References 
All details and specifications are from the CNET review and specification page unless otherwise indicated.

Footnotes

Samsung smartphones
I300
Palm OS devices
Mobile phones introduced in 2001